The 2019 Copa CONMEBOL Sudamericana was the 18th edition of the CONMEBOL Sudamericana (also referred to as the Copa Sudamericana, or ), South America's secondary club football tournament organized by CONMEBOL.

Ecuadorian club Independiente del Valle defeated Argentine club Colón by a 3–1 score in the final to win their first tournament title. As champions, Independiente del Valle earned the right to play against the winners of the 2019 Copa Libertadores in the 2020 Recopa Sudamericana. They also automatically qualified for the 2020 Copa Libertadores group stage. They would also have played the winners of the 2019 J.League Cup in the 2020 J.League Cup / Copa Sudamericana Championship, but it would not be held due to the 2020 Tokyo Olympics scheduled at the same time.

On 14 August 2018, CONMEBOL decided that starting from the 2019 edition, the final will be played as a single match, and although it was originally stated that the final would be played in Lima, Peru at the Estadio Nacional, on 9 May 2019 the confederation's Council decided to switch the venue to Estadio Defensores del Chaco in Asunción, Paraguay. On 21 June 2019, APF announced that Estadio General Pablo Rojas in Asunción will host the 2019 final due to remodeling works at the Estadio Defensores del Chaco.

Athletico Paranaense were the defending champions, but did not play this edition as they qualified for the 2019 Copa Libertadores group stage as Copa Sudamericana champions and later advanced to the knockout stage.

Teams
The following 44 teams from the 10 CONMEBOL associations qualified for the tournament, entering the first stage:
Argentina and Brazil: 6 berths each
All other associations: 4 berths each

A further 10 teams eliminated from the 2019 Copa Libertadores were transferred to the Copa Sudamericana, entering the second stage.

Schedule
The schedule of the competition was as follows. After changing the dates of the 2019 Copa América, the Brazilian Football Confederation released on 3 October 2018 its calendar for the following year, with new dates for the Copa Sudamericana.

Draws

First stage

Second stage

Final stages

Seeding

Bracket

Round of 16

Quarter-finals

Semi-finals

Final

Statistics

Top scorers

Top assists

See also
2019 Copa Libertadores
2020 Recopa Sudamericana

References

External links
CONMEBOL Sudamericana 2019, CONMEBOL.com

 
2019
2